Megalothorax is a genus of springtails in the family Neelidae. There are about 14 described species in Megalothorax.

Species
These 14 species belong to the genus Megalothorax:

 Megalothorax aquaticus Stach, 1951
 Megalothorax carpaticus
 Megalothorax draco
 Megalothorax granulosus Schneider & D'Haese, 2013
 Megalothorax hipmani
 Megalothorax maculosus Maynard
 Megalothorax massoudi Deharveng, 1978
 Megalothorax minimus Willem, 1900
 Megalothorax nigropunctatus Schneider & D'Haese, 2013
 Megalothorax potapovi Schneider, Porco & Deharveng, 2016
 Megalothorax sanguineus Schneider, Porco & Deharveng, 2016
 Megalothorax svalbardensis Schneider & D'Haese, 2013
 Megalothorax tatrensis
 Megalothorax tuberculatus Deharveng & Beruete, 1993

References

Further reading

External links

 

Collembola
Articles created by Qbugbot
Springtail genera